Bunchosia tutensis is a species of plant in the Malpighiaceae family. It is endemic to Panama.

References

Endemic flora of Panama
tutensis
Data deficient plants
Taxonomy articles created by Polbot